Count Christian Moritz von Koenigsegg und Rothfels (November 24, 1705 – July 21, 1778 in Vienna) was a field marshal of the Holy Roman Empire.

He went into the military service early and joined the regiment of his uncle, the Field Marshal Joseph Lothar von Königsegg, and would eventually become colonel. In 1734 he fought in the Battle of Guastalla and was wounded. He fought in the wars against the Turks and the War of Austrian Succession. After the Peace of Aachen, he was named Imperial ambassador at the court of the Electorate of Cologne and was promoted to Feldzeugmeister.

In the Seven Years' War he fought in Bohemia and was defeated in the Battle of Reichenberg. Nevertheless, he was appointed Field Marshal in 1758. Being a knight of the Teutonic Order; during his later years he commanded the Bailiwick of Alsace and Burgundy.

See also
List of field marshals of the Holy Roman Empire

References

1705 births
1778 deaths
Austrian military personnel of the War of the Austrian Succession
Field marshals of the Holy Roman Empire
People of the Silesian Wars